Haruna Chanongo (born 14 November 1991) is a Tanzanian professional footballer who plays as a midfielder.

International career

International goals
Scores and results list Tanzania's goal tally first.

References

External links 
 

1991 births
Living people
Tanzanian footballers
Zanzibari footballers
People from Mjini Magharibi Region
Tanzania international footballers
Association football midfielders